Goose Creek Memorial High School is a public high school in an unincorporated area of Harris County, Texas, United States, and is located north of Baytown.  Goose Creek Memorial is one of the three public high schools in the Goose Creek Consolidated Independent School District and was built to accommodate the growing population of northern Goose Creek CISD. It was opened with grades 9 to 11 for the 2008–2009 school year, adding students in grade 12 the following year.   In 2011, the school was rated "Academically Acceptable" by the Texas Education Agency.

Goose Creek Memorial High School is home to the Global Business Academy and it is an AVID National Demonstration School. GCM offers opportunities for students to be college and career ready, including Dual Credit, welding, commercial photography, and more.

History
The school was built as part of the district's 2005 bond, worth a total of $220.5 million. The school was to open with grades 9, 10, and 11; its first graduation would occur in 2010. The school initially had 1,200 students and 82 teachers. The dedication ceremony was scheduled for February 2, 2009.

The Goose Creek CISD board took 33 names suggested by area residents and engaged four rounds of voting. The most popular choices were Goose Creek Memorial, Sam Houston, and Juan Seguin, and the board selected Memorial. The CCISD approved the school's name on August 27, 2007.

Neighborhoods served by Goose Creek Memorial
The school's attendance boundary includes unincorporated areas, including Meadowlake Village, Springfield,  Craigmont,  Eastpoint, McNair, and Highlands.

Mascot and colors
A selection of students and parents in the anticipated attendance zone for Goose Creek Memorial were in charge of selecting the choice of the school mascot and colors. They selected the school mascot and the colors red, black, and silver.

Athletics
Goose Creek, upon opening, joined the University Interscholastic League (UIL) 4A school group. School officials projected it would be upgraded to rank 5A after population growth occurred. By July 1, 2008, the school hired its head coaches.

The Goose Creek Memorial Patriots compete in the following sports:

Cross Country, Volleyball, Football, Basketball, Soccer, Golf, Tennis, Track, Softball & Baseball

References

External links
Goose Creek Consolidated ISD

Goose Creek Consolidated Independent School District high schools
Educational institutions established in 2008
2008 establishments in Texas